The grey-winged trumpeter (Psophia crepitans) is a member of a small family of birds, the Psophiidae. It is found in Brazil, Colombia, Ecuador, French Guiana, Guyana, Peru, Suriname, and Venezuela.

Taxonomy and systematics

The grey-winged trumpeter's taxonomy is unsettled. The International Ornithological Committee (IOC), the South American Classification Committee of the American Ornithological Society, and the Clements taxonomy assign it three subspecies: the nominate P. c. crepitans, P. c. napensis, and P. c. ochroptera. Some authors treat P. c. ochroptera as a subspecies of the pale-winged trumpeter (P. leucoptera) and BirdLife International's Handbook of the Birds of the World treats it as a separate species, the ochre-winged trumpeter. In addition, there has been some suggestion that the other two subspecies also warrant treatment as species.

This article follows the three-subspecies model.

Description

The grey-winged trumpeter is a chicken-like bird with a long neck and legs and a hump-backed profile. The sexes are similar in appearance. Their stout, slightly decurved, bill is yellowish green and their legs and feet greenish olive. Their plumage is mostly black. The nominate subspecies has green or violet iridescence on the lower neck. Its inner wings and rump are ashy gray and the middle of the back is ochre to chestnut. Subspecies P. c. napensis has bronzy or purple iridescence, lighter gray wings and rump, and a more ferruginous back. P. c. ochroptera has entirely ochraceous wings, rump, and middle back.

Distribution and habitat

The grey-winged trumpeter is a bird of the northern Amazon Basin. The nominate subspecies is found from southeastern Colombia east through eastern and southern Venezuela and the Guianas and south into Brazil to the Amazon River east of the Rio Negro. P. c. ochroptera is found in northwestern Brazil north of the Amazon and west of the Rio Negro. P. c. napensis is found from southeastern Colombia south through eastern Ecuador into northeastern Peru and east into extreme northwestern Brazil north of the Amazon.

The grey-winged trumpeter inhabits dense lowland tropical rainforest. Within that broad category it favors landscapes away from human habitations and with an open understory and many fruiting trees. Despite being mostly a bird of the lowlands it sometimes can be found in higher elevation cloudforest.

Behavior

The grey-winged trumpeter is a gregarious species that lives in flocks of up to about 15 birds of all ages.

Movement

The grey-winged trumpeter is entirely non-migratory and tends to move only within the flock's territories. It does not cross major rivers.

Feeding

Adult grey-winged trumpeters feed mostly on soft fruit that has fallen to the forest floor. Though much of it has been knocked loose or picked and dropped by squirrel monkeys or arboreal birds, it tends to persist so the trumpeters do not need follow monkey troops. Fruits eaten are usually those of large trees but trumpeters will pick fruit from shrubs as well. About 10% of their diet is small arthropods, some of which they capture when following army ant swarms. Chicks are fed a greater percentage of arthropods when young. Adults also eat small vertebrates but only rarely.

Breeding

Grey-winged trumpeters are polyandrous and cooperative breeders. Up to three males mate with the dominant female of the flock, and all members contribute to raising the young. The species usually nests in holes in trees that have been excavated by other species, and sometimes also in natural breaks where for instance a trunk has split. They do not build a nest in the hole. They apparently time their breeding so the eggs hatch at the beginning of the local rainy season when fruit, and especially insects, are abundant. The clutch size is two to four eggs but usually three.

Vocalization

All trumpeters are highly vocal. The grey-winged trumpeter's song is a low humming "wuh-wuh-wuh wuh wuh - -". Its alarm call is "loud, harsh 'GRAH' notes".

In captivity

Indigenous peoples tame trumpeters as sentinals because of their predator-spotting ability and loud alarm call; they are also thought to kill snakes.

A captive grey-winged trumpeter named Trumpy was kept at Jersey Zoo by the author Gerald Durrell, and was noted for interacting with the people and animals of the zoo. "Trumpy" is mentioned several times in Durrell's book "Menagerie Manor".

Status

The IUCN follows HBW taxonomy and so assesses the grey-winged and ochre-winged trumpters separately. Both are rated as being of Least Concern. The population size of neither is known but both are believed to be decreasing. The white-winged trumpeter sensu lato is heavily hunted. It is frequently trapped by indigenous peoples but does not reproduce in that captivity. Deforestation for timber, ranching, and gold mining is an ongoing threat.

Gallery

References

External links
 Stamps (with RangeMap(~accurate))
 "Gray-winged trumpeter" photo gallery VIREO Photo-High Res

grey-winged trumpeter
Birds of the Guianas
Birds of the Amazon Basin
Birds of the Colombian Amazon
Birds of the Venezuelan Amazon
Birds of the Ecuadorian Amazon
Birds of the Peruvian Amazon
Birds described in 1758
Taxa named by Carl Linnaeus